Osterizer is a brand which has been used by Oster Manufacturing for its line of blenders since 1946.

History
It has been claimed to be the first mainstream brand of blender, though technically the Waring blender brand was introduced in 1937.

In 1946, Oster acquired the Stevens Electric Company,  which had received a patent on the liquifying blender in 1922. Oster itself was bought by Sunbeam Corporation in 1960.

The blender
Osterizer blenders tended towards heavy construction and motors. While this raised cost, many early-model Osterizers still function today, and are more powerful than a majority of contemporary consumer blenders.

Popular culture
Oster Platinum Face 60-Minute Timer celebrated the 80th Anniversary in December 2010.

There is an Osterizer blender in the kitchen in the film Bumblebee.

There is an Osterizer blender in the film “ET”.

Sources
 J. Hebey, Domestic Aesthetic: Household Art 1920–1970, 5 Continents Publishing, 2003. .
 M. Young, World Almanac Book of Records, World Almanac, 2006. .
 B. Huxford, Garage Sale & Flea Market Annual, Collector Books, 2004. .

Notes

External links
 Oster Official Site

Home appliance brands
Products introduced in 1946